In the NUTS (Nomenclature of Territorial Units for Statistics) codes of Malta (MT), the three levels are:

NUTS codes
MT0 Malta
MT00 Malta
MT001 Malta (island)
MT002 Gozo and Comino

Local administrative units

Below the NUTS levels, the two LAU (Local Administrative Units) levels are:

The LAU codes of Malta can be downloaded here:

See also
 Regions of Malta
 Subdivisions of Malta
 ISO 3166-2 codes of Malta

Sources
 Hierarchical list of the Nomenclature of territorial units for statistics - NUTS and the Statistical regions of Europe
 Overview map of EU Countries - NUTS level 1
 MALTA - NUTS level 2
 MALTA - NUTS level 2
 Correspondence between the NUTS levels and the national administrative units
 List of current NUTS codes
 Download current NUTS codes (ODS format)
 Regions of Malta, Statoids.com

Malta
Nuts